Charles Buckeridge (circa 1832–73) was a British Gothic Revival architect who trained as a pupil of Sir George Gilbert Scott. He practised in Oxford 1856–68 and in London from 1869. He was made an Associate of the Royal Institute of British Architects in 1861.

Family

Charles was born in France, the son of Charles Elliott Buckeridge and his wife Eliza, the daughter of John  Eyre of Reading, Berkshire. He grew up in Salisbury in Wiltshire. He was married and raised three sons and three daughters in Oxford, including John Hingeston Buckeridge, who was a church architect, and Charles Edgar Buckeridge (1864–1898), who painted church interiors. Charles was brother-in-law of the botanist Giles Munby.

He died of heart disease at the age of 40 on 1 September 1873 in Hampstead, and was buried at St John's Church there.

Work
Much of Buckeridge's work was for parish churches and other institutions of the Church of England. Dates that Sherwood and Pevsner cite for work at Charlbury and Emmington suggest that these works, like that at Bletchingdon, were completed posthumously.

St Cross School, Oxford, 1858 (for a time the premises of St Cross College, Oxford)
All Saints, Mears Ashby, Northamptonshire: restoration, 1859; vicarage, 1860
Ascot Priory, Ascot, Berkshire: buildings for the Society of the Holy Trinity, 1861
St Mary the Virgin, Cottisford, Oxfordshire: restoration, 1861
St Peter, Wolvercote, Oxfordshire: rebuilt church, 1862
St Helen, Benson, Oxfordshire: new chancel, 1862
St John the Evangelist, Little Tew, Oxfordshire: teacher's house, school and almshouses, 1862
10, Parks Road, Oxford: house, 1862
9, Norham Gardens, Oxford: house, 1862–63
St Peter, Little Wittenham, Berkshire (now Oxfordshire): rebuilt church, 1863
All Saints, Blackwater, Hampshire: extension, 1863
Court House, New Road, Oxford, 1863
Saint Swithun, Merton, Oxfordshire: restoration, 1865
St Mary, Streatley, Berkshire: rebuilt church, 1865
3, Norham Gardens, Oxford: house, 1865–66
St Peter, Radway, Warwickshire, 1866
Society of the Holy Trinity, Oxford: new convent, 1866–68 (now St Antony's College, Oxford)
St Nicholas, Britwell Salome, Oxfordshire: restoration, 1867
St Mary, Lower Heyford, Oxfordshire: remodelled Old Rectory, 1867
St Mary, Lower Heyford, Oxfordshire: restored church, 1867–68
All Saints, Wellingborough, Northamptonshire, 1867–68
St Peter, Cogenhoe, Northamptonshire: restoration, 1868–69
Holy Cross, Shipton-on-Cherwell, Oxfordshire: restoration, 1869
St John the Evangelist, Little Tew, Oxfordshire: church tower, 1869
St Andrew, South Stoke, Oxfordshire: Vicarage, 1869
SS James & John chapel, Brackley, Northamptonshire: restoration, 1869–70
St Helen, Benson, Oxfordshire: Old Vicarage, 1869–70
St Nicholas, Chadlington, Oxfordshire: new chancel, 1870
All Saints, Emscote, Warwick: font cover, 1871
St Mary, Little Houghton, Northamptonshire: rebuilding, 1873
St Peter, Steeple Aston, Oxfordshire: restoration, 1873
St John's Home, Leopold Street, Oxford (now part of All Saints' Convent), 1873
St Michael and All Angels, Clifton Hampden, Oxfordshire: reredos mosaic of the Last Supper, 1873
St Mary the Virgin, Charlbury, Oxfordshire: new chancel, 1874
St Nicholas, Emmington, Oxfordshire: rebuilt chancel and nave, 1874
St Giles, Bletchingdon, Oxfordshire: restoration planned 1869 and completed posthumously in 1878.
Salisbury Cathedral, Wiltshire: reredos paintings in north transept

References

Sources

1832 births
1873 deaths
19th-century English architects
Architects of cathedrals
English ecclesiastical architects
Gothic Revival architects
People from Salisbury
Architects from Wiltshire
Associates of the Royal Institute of British Architects